Robert Elwood Carey (September 24, 1904 – April 16, 1933) was an American racecar driver.

Career
Carey's first national championship race was the 1932 Indianapolis 500.  Having taken the lead after Billy Arnold had crashed out, Carey endured a blown right rear tire (causing him to spin three times without hitting the wall or another car), and later a damaged shock absorber; in total he lost over twelve minutes to the leader and later winner, Fred Frame, but managed to erase four minutes of the interval and finished fourth.

Carey went on to win rain-shortened races at the dirt tracks in Detroit and Syracuse, and clinched the 1932 national title by finishing second in the season finale at Oakland Speedway with points leader Frame dropping out.  No other rookie driver would win the national championship until reigning Formula One champion Nigel Mansell in 1993.

Carey was fatally injured in an accident at Legion Ascot Speedway prior to the 1933 season.  He crashed in practice after appearing to have a hung throttle.

Awards
Carey was inducted into the National Sprint Car Hall of Fame in 2005.

Indianapolis 500 results

References

External links

1904 births
1933 deaths
Sportspeople from Anderson, Indiana
Racing drivers from Indiana
Champ Car champions
Indianapolis 500 drivers
AAA Championship Car drivers
Racing drivers who died while racing
Sports deaths in California
National Sprint Car Hall of Fame inductees